In enzymology, a 1,6-alpha-D-mannosidase is an enzyme that catalyzes the chemical reaction of separating the 1,6-linked alpha-D-mannose residues in alpha-D-Manp-(1->6)-D-Manp.

This enzyme belongs to the family of hydrolases, specifically those glycosidases that hydrolyse O- and S-glycosyl compounds.  The systematic name of this enzyme class is 1,6-alpha-mannosyl alpha-D-mannohydrolase.

References

 

EC 3.2.1
Enzymes of unknown structure